Matthew Armstrong (born 1 March 1967) is a former Australian rules footballer who played with Fitzroy and North Melbourne in the VFL/AFL. He was a regular interstate representative for his home state of Tasmania.

Armstrong played in many positions, as an on baller, half back, centre or wingman. He was with Fitzroy from 1987 to 1994 and played 132 games. In 1995 he moved to North Melbourne and was the season's second highest disposal getter for the club. Despite missing just five games in the 1996 home and away season he was omitted from the side which defeated Sydney in the grand final.

He was sometimes involved in spectacular solo efforts to win games breaking out of the centre melee with a direct run at goal, but would only do so at the end of close games.   Otherwise he was frequently unnoticed on the field, perhaps due to his relatively short stature or perhaps mainly to the blink-fast speed of his disposal of the ball, usually to great effect. 

He seemed to show a singular strategic sense and his handspeed resulted in an unparalleled ability to break lines of defence and an uncanny number of plays involving or commencing with him resulted in scoring shots, sometimes several disposals later.  This ability was recognized by teammates but often overlooked by coaches and selectors; testified to by Wayne Carey making special mention of the non-selected Matthew Armstrong in his 1996 Premiership Cup acceptance speech.

He later became coach of the Tasmanian Devils Football Club.

External links 
 
 

1967 births
Living people
Fitzroy Football Club players
North Melbourne Football Club players
Hobart Football Club players
Tasmanian State of Origin players
Australian rules footballers from Tasmania
Tasmanian Football Hall of Fame inductees
Victorian State of Origin players
North Launceston Football Club coaches
North Launceston Football Club players